Kalsdorf bei Graz is a municipality in the district Graz-Umgebung in Styria, Austria.

Geography 
Kalsdorf lies about 13 km south of Graz next to the river Mur.

Subdivisions 
Cadastral communities: Forst, Thalerhof, Großsulz, and Kleinsulz

References

Cities and towns in Graz-Umgebung District